Reïna-Flor Okori Makendengue (born 2 May 1980) is a 4x Olympian with over 20 years on the track representing France and Equatorial Guinea. Using her sports legacy and African soul blueprint, Reina inspires and coaches international businesses, executives, and athletes to redefine the new psychology of winning and leading. In 2015 she took allegiance back to Equatorial Guinea, represented her country for the Olympic games of Rio 2016, and became a flag bearer.

Okori was born in Libreville, Gabon after her parents fled Equatorial Guinea, due to the political persecution during the dictatorship of Francisco Macías Nguema. Her grandparents were Equatoguineans, each with different ethnic groups, except for her paternal grandfather (an Igbo man from Nigeria).

As a junior, she finished tenth in long jump at the 1996 World Junior Championships and won the 1999 European Junior Championships in 100 meters hurdles.

She finished fifth at the 2001 Summer Universiade and sixth at the 2007 European Indoor Championships. She competed at the 2004 Olympics, the 2005 European Indoor Championships, the 2005 World Championships and the 2006 European Championships, the 2013 European indoor championship in Goteborg and world outdoor world championships in Moscou reaching the semi-finals.

At the 2008 Olympics, Okori reached the semi-finals of the 100 metres hurdles.  She repeated this feat at the 2012 Summer Olympics, but was disqualified in the semi-finals. She was the flag bearer of Equatorial Guinea at the 2016 Olympics, where she was going to represent the African country before finally retiring from athletics.

Prize list 

 10 selections for French Elite Teams (as of 1/1/07)
  French Champion 2004 at 100 m hurdles in 12.71 s (+2,1 m/s) 
  French Champion 2008 at 100 m hurdles in 12.78 s
  European Junior Champion 1999 at 100 m hurdles in 13.16 s
  Vice-champion of France 2005 at 100 m hurdles in 12.75 s (+0,9 m/s)
  Vice-champion of France 2006 at 100 m hurdles in 12.99 s (+0,7 m/s)
  Vice-champion of France 2012 at 100 m hurdles in 12.97 s (+1,3 m/s)
  Champion of France 2012 at 60 m hurdles Indoors in 8.08 s
 1st in final of DécaNation 2006 in 12.87 s
 6th in semi-final of 100 m hurdles at the 2004 Athens Olympic Games in 12.81 s
 4th in final of 100 m hurdles at the 2005 Mediterranean Games in 13.20 s
 6th in semi-final of the 100 m hurdles at the 2005 World Championships in 12.99 s
 5th in semi-final of the 100 m hurdles at the 2006 European Championships in 13.08 s

Personal Bests

References

EAA profile

1980 births
Living people
Sportspeople from Libreville
Citizens of Equatorial Guinea through descent
Equatoguinean emigrants to France
Naturalized citizens of France
Equatoguinean people of Nigerian descent
Sportspeople of Nigerian descent
Black French sportspeople
French people of Equatoguinean descent
French people of Nigerian descent
French people of Igbo descent
French people of Benga descent
Equatoguinean female hurdlers
French female hurdlers
Athletes (track and field) at the 2004 Summer Olympics
Athletes (track and field) at the 2008 Summer Olympics
Athletes (track and field) at the 2012 Summer Olympics
Athletes (track and field) at the 2016 Summer Olympics
Olympic athletes of France
Universiade medalists in athletics (track and field)
Universiade bronze medalists for France
Medalists at the 2001 Summer Universiade
Athletes (track and field) at the 2005 Mediterranean Games
Mediterranean Games competitors for France
21st-century Gabonese people